The Great General (碧血青天珍珠旗) is a 30-episode 1994 Hong Kong TV series produced by ATV. It is the sequel to the series Heroic Legend of the Yang's Family, featuring mostly the same cast.

Plot
Long existed the legend that one can overlord the world with the help of the Banner of Hegemony. During the search for this banner under Song (Cantonese: Sung) emperor's decree, Joeng Zung-bou takes back a professed owner who turns out to be an assassin to severely injure the emperor, which brings Joeng Zung-bou to jail term as an accused traitor. In the hope of getting some help from judge Baau Cing, Joeng Zung-bou's daughter-in-law Wai Ling-ji runs away in pregnancy and unfortunately encounters a mob working for the ambitious prince Ziu Dak-jam who is plotting conspiracy, but is lucky enough to be rescued by the patriotic general Dik Cing, who then takes their message to Baau Cing and eventually have the Joengs rescued. At this moment, the Banner of Hegemony appears in Western Xia, as Dik Cing and Joeng Zung-bou are ordered to bring it back. On their way, they met Lei Jyun-hou, Emperor of Western Xia who is suffering temporary amnesia and they become sworn brothers with him. Later, Lei Jyun-hou recovers from amnesia and turns back against his brothers to strive for the banner. A bloody war is about to begin.

Cast
 Note: The characters' names are in Cantonese romanisation.

References
Product on Amazon.com

Asia Television original programming
Works based on The Generals of the Yang Family
Television series set in the Northern Song
Television series set in the Western Xia
Fictional depictions of Bao Zheng in television
Television shows set in Kaifeng